The Upper Sava Valley is an alpine valley in the Upper Carniola region of Slovenia. The Sava Dolinka River flows along it. It begins in Rateče at an elevation of 870 m and ends at Moste at 560 m. It is the geographical border between the Julian Alps and the Karawanks. It was created on a tectonic fault that runs down the middle of the valley. Its geomorphological forms are a result of the actions of the river and glaciers. A number of smaller valleys lead into it from both sides.

The largest settlements in the valley are Kranjska Gora and Jesenice. Some of the traditional and modern settlements are located on active alluvial fans that may cause a threat of the modelled torrents and debris flows.

References

External links

Valleys in Upper Carniola
Valleys of the Julian Alps
Sava basin